Sami Khoshaba Latchin is an ethnic Assyrian and Christian Iraqi-born U.S. citizen, who was jailed for four years for acting as a sleeper agent of the Iraqi government by another former Iraqi soldier who is now a sheriff in Des Plaines Illinois.

Biography
Sami Khoshaba Latchin was born in Duhok, Iraq. He moved to the U.S. in 1993, and became a naturalized U.S. citizen in 1998.

Spy charges

Latchin was arrested by U.S. federal agents in August 2004, on charges of making false statements to immigration officials when he applied for his citizenship.  The indictment claimed Latchin failed to disclose his employment by the Iraqi Intelligence Service and membership Iraq's Baath Party.  It also claimed that Latchin was a deep undercover "sleeper" spy, and that he had travelled overseas three times to meet with his handlers. Latchin pleaded innocent to these charges. He was sentenced to four years in prison.

References

American people of Iraqi-Assyrian descent
Living people
Year of birth missing (living people)